Heinz Bader (born 10 October 1940) is a German former ice hockey player. He competed in the men's tournament at the 1968 Winter Olympics.

References

External links
 

1940 births
Living people
German ice hockey players
Ice hockey players at the 1968 Winter Olympics
Olympic ice hockey players of West Germany
People from Bad Tölz
Sportspeople from Upper Bavaria